Kujavy is a municipality and village in Nový Jičín District in the Moravian-Silesian Region of the Czech Republic. It has about 500 inhabitants.

Notable people
Anton Freissler (1838–1916), Austrian inventor

References

Villages in Nový Jičín District